The Colorado Department of Higher Education (DHE) is the principal department of the Colorado state government responsible for implementing the policies of the Colorado Commission on Higher Education (CCHE).

As the policy and advocacy coordinating board for Colorado's system of public higher education, the Department and Colorado Commission on Higher Education carry out the policies of the General Assembly and serve as a bridge between the Governor and Legislature and the governing boards of the institutions of higher education. The Department acts as a coordinating body for public two-year and four-year institutions and authorizes private schools and colleges to operate in the state. Several departmental agencies are under the Colorado Department of Higher Education:

College Assist 
CollegeInvest
College In Colorado
History Colorado
Colorado GEAR UP
Division of Private Occupational Schools
Colorado Opportunity Scholarship Initiative
StudyColorado

See also 
 Colorado Commission on Higher Education
 Colorado Department of Education

References

External links 
 Colorado Department of Higher Education
Colorado Rises: Advancing Education and Talent Development

State agencies of Colorado